Cordignano is a town and comune with 7,020 inhabitants in the province of Treviso, Veneto, Italy.

Morphology of the territory 

Element that strongly characterizes the region is the presence of Meschio River, which runs through the town, coming from Vittorio Veneto.

History 
The first inhabited center of the territory of the municipality dates back to prehistoric times. It then traces of a fort (known as Castelat) dated between the 14th and 10th centuries BC, in the north, at the Alpine foothills of Belluno.

In Roman times the area continued to grow mainly in the agricultural field, forming an active farming community still witnessed in the Middle Ages. It was in this period that the center took on the name Corticionus (hence Cordignano).

In the 13th century it became the curia of Da Camino, then between the 15th and 18th century it was a fief of the Rangoni family of Modena, passing in the 18th century to the branch of the Mocenigo family in Venice with residence at San Stae.

In the 20th century Cordignano should be remembered for the development of the craft industry, and then the industry, still thriving today, in part by changing the orientation of agricultural previous centuries and behaving even a redesign of the territory, with vast industrial zones and new infrastructure.

Places of interest

Religious buildings

Churches 
The different centers that draw the municipal area, mostly of rural origin, find their center in the ancient religious buildings are listed below those of historical and architectural importance:
 The Church of Saint Maria Assunta and  Cassiano del Meschio is the church of Cordignano center, the hub of the city. It was built in the 17th century, stands on the foundations of ancient buildings dating back to the pre-existing Roman and medieval times; the current building has a gabled façade divided into three by pairs of Ionic pilasters, terminating in a pediment surmounted by jagged and three sculptures. Internally it contains artistic works by Palma il Giovane, Giovanni De Min, Marco Domenico Tintoretto and Marco Vecellio. It is also characterized by the presence, on the left side of a tall bell tower of the 20th century.
 St. Stephen's Church is the parish church of the frazione Pinidello important for the cycle of frescoes of the interior, attributed to Francesco Del Zotto. 
 Church of San Zeno is the ancient church (13th century), of the frazione Silvella. 
 Church of San Valentino church of Ponte della Muda, with a small bell tower and a large stone statue of the patron saint inserted in front, above the stone portal.

Parish recreation centres 
 Oratory of Via Isonzo: octagonal building with a gabled portal, is inserted between the buildings of downtown and in a good condition.
 Oratory of Via Piave: small religious building with gabled façade with a portal surmounted by a tympanum heavily remodeled; is located adjacent to an old village and is in a poor state of preservation.

Civic buildings 
Among the civil architecture of some significance, the agricultural past has left the old villages (including those held arcades in the center of the capital, in the 17th century), rural houses and some mansions, homes of families who have had influence on the territory and architectural expressions of their prestige.

Venetian villas 
Below is a list of the main Venetian villas in the municipality:
 Villa Rota Brandolini d'Adda Casanova Zanussi (18th century)
 Villa Mocenigo called "Belvedere" (Villa di Villa, 17th century)
 Villa Pizzamiglio (Silvella, 18th century)

Palace of the duty 
Building of the 16th century in Ponte della Muda, the Palace was the seat of customs duty post in the only crossing place of the Meschio on the Venice-Udine, in fact the bridge of muda that gave name to the place. The property has a large covered porch with vaulted ceilings on the ground floor, with round arches supported by columns decorated with sculptural elements, the first floor is open by single lancet rectangular and surmounted by a mezzanine in the attic.

Natural areas 
Cordignano is located south of the river Meschio, passing through the center of the square at the height of Piazza Italia, wetting the northern part of the park of Villa Rota Brandolini d'Adda.
The many loops and the banks of the river, surrounded by numerous areas where the rural landscape keeps a certain integrity, strongly characterizing the territory of Cordignano.

Events 
 Premio Nazionale di Pittura, Grafica e Acquerello – Piero Della Valentina: annually, in the fall, is held a national painting prize established in 1989 which attracts artists from all over Italy and from abroad.
 Festa delle prealpi (Feast of the Alpine foothills): in autumn; sculptors create their works for visitors, there are typical handicraft market, food stalls and the prize of the woodcutter.

People related to Cordignano 
 Ennio Salvador, cyclist (born 1960)

Demographics trends

Ethnicities and foreign minorities 
There are 638 foreign residents in the municipality, 8.9% of the population. The following are the largest groups:
 Albanians, 156
 Romanians, 130
 Moroccans, 82
 Macedonians, 36

References 

Cities and towns in Veneto